Đorđe Milošević (born 20 June 1993) is a Serbian professional basketball player for Champagne Basket of the LNB Pro B.

External links
 Đorđe Milošević at aba-liga.com
 Đorđe Milošević at eurobasket.com
 Đorđe Milošević at fiba.com

1993 births
Living people
ABA League players
Champagne Châlons-Reims Basket players
KK Igokea players
KK Hemofarm players
KK Sutjeska players
Sportspeople from Jagodina
Serbian expatriate basketball people in Bosnia and Herzegovina
Serbian expatriate basketball people in Montenegro
Serbian expatriate basketball people in North Macedonia
Serbian men's basketball players
Small forwards
Shooting guards